The Voice UK is a British television music competition to find new singing talent. The third series began airing on 11 January 2014 on BBC One, as opposed to the usual start in March. will.i.am and Tom Jones returned as coaches, while Kylie Minogue and Ricky Wilson joined the show as replacements for former coaches, Jessie J and Danny O'Donoghue. Emma Willis and Marvin Humes co-presented the show for the first time, replacing Holly Willoughby and Reggie Yates.

On 9 February 2014, it was announced that a new spin off show called The Voice: Louder on Two would air every weekday during the live shows on BBC Two hosted by Zoë Ball.

Jermain Jackman of Team Will was crowned as the winner of the series on 5 April 2014, making him the first male artist to win the show. Also, Jackman is the first winner in the show's history (before Ruti Olajugbagbe in the seventh series, Blessing Chitapa in the ninth series and Craig Eddie in the tenth series) to have only received one-chair turn in the blind auditions.

This series was the only series to feature Minogue as a coach.

Coaches

On 5 July 2013, Jessie J announced that she would not be returning as a coach for the third series due to touring commitments in support for her second album, Alive. On 16 July, it was announced that Danny O'Donoghue would not be returning either as he wanted to concentrate on The Script. People rumoured to be in the running to join the panel as replacements for Jessie J and O'Donoghue included Rita Ora, Emeli Sande, Kylie Minogue, Marvin Humes, Melanie C and Cheryl Cole, though Cole was ruled out of the running after rejoining rival show, The X Factor. On 11 September, it was confirmed that Minogue would become a coach for the third series, along with the confirmation of returning coaches will.i.am and Tom Jones. On 15 September, Holly Willoughby and Reggie Yates announced that they would not be returning to co-present the third series, and Emma Willis was announced as Willoughby's replacement. On 17 September, Humes confirmed that he would replace Yates as Willis' co-presenter. On 19 September, Kaiser Chiefs singer Ricky Wilson confirmed that he would be a coach and O'Donoghue's replacement for the third series. On 9 February 2014, it was announced that Zoë Ball would present spin-off show The Voice: Louder on Two. The show was axed after the series.

Promotion
On 21 December 2013, the first trailer for the series premiered following the final of Strictly Come Dancing at 21:50. The trailer features all four coaches dressed in different medical costumes. They overlook a hospital ward, as many babies cry behind them. Then, the sound of a beautiful voice is heard from the direction of the babies, and stops all the crying. The voice captures the attention of Minogue and Wilson, who both turn around to see who is singing. will.i.am and Jones then turn, as the voice is revealed to be one of the babies, prompting the tagline "A Star is Born". On 1 January 2014, a new edition of the trailer aired, where another baby sings, in a more R&B style, also impressing the coaches.

As part of BBC One's promotion of its 2014 schedule, The Voice UK aired the first clips of the Blind Auditions, featuring a male artist walking to the microphone, a mother being reunited with her daughter following her performance, Emma Willis with a family watching a performance, the coaches' opening performance, and Minogue opening the trailer saying "This waiting, it's killer. And the anticipation", and she also tells an artist (unknown to the viewer) that they have "done the thing which is the thing that we [coaches] are waiting for."

On 6 January 2014, the series had its press launch at Broadcasting House. All four coaches were present, as were the two new presenters. The coaches spoke to members of the press, and in the week leading up to the premiere, the show was highly publicised by the British media, with coaches giving interviews in the Radio Times, The Metro, Digital Spy and The Telegraph. Later that day, will.i.am and Kylie Minogue appeared on the new-look One Show, where they talked about the show and last year's finalist, Leah McFall.

Teams
The teams were revealed during 22 February blind audition episode.

Colour key

Blind auditions
The blind auditions returned to dock10, MediaCityUK on 1 October 2013. Each coach has the length of the artists' performance to decide if they want that artist on their team. Should two or more coaches want the same artist, then the artist will choose their coach.

Episode 1 (11 January)
The premiere was 90 minutes long, and aired from 7.00pm till 8.30pm.

Group performance: The Voice UK coaches – Medley of "I Predict a Riot"/"Can't Get You Out of My Head"

Episode 2 (18 January)
The second episode was broadcast on 18 January, was 80 minutes long, and aired from 7.00pm till 8.20pm.

Episode 3 (25 January)

This was the first show in which one coach did not get any acts. Kylie did not get any.
This show was 75 minutes long, and aired from 7.00pm until 8.15pm.

Episode 4 (1 February)

This show was 80 minutes long, and aired from 7.15pm till 8.35pm.

Episode 5 (8 February)

This episode was 85 minutes long, and aired from 7.10pm till 8.35pm.
{| class="wikitable" style="text-align:center; width:100%;"
|-
! scope="col" rowspan="2" style="width:05%;"| Order
! scope="col" rowspan="2" style="width:24%;"| Artist
! scope="col" rowspan="2" style="width:05%;"| Age
! scope="col" rowspan="2" style="width:26%;"| Song
! colspan="4" style="width:40%;"| Coaches and artists choices
|-
! style="width:10%;"| will.i.am
! style="width:10%;"| Kylie
! style="width:10%;"| Tom
! style="width:10%;"| Ricky
|-
! scope="col" | 1
| Steven Alexander
| 27
| "Your Game"
| —
| style="background:#fdfc8f;text-align:center;" | 
| 
| —
|-style="background:#DCDCDC
! scope="col" | 2
| Fiona Kelly
| 56
|"Rule the World"
| —
| —
| —
| —
|-
! scope="col" | 3
| Chris Royal
| 25
| "Wake Me Up"
| —
| 
| 
| style="background:#fdfc8f;text-align:center;" | 
|-style="background:#DCDCDC
! scope="col" | 4
| style="background:#DCDCDC; text-align:center;" | Nick Dixon
| style="background:#DCDCDC; text-align:center;" | 17
| style="background:#DCDCDC; text-align:center;" |"Home Again"
| —
| —
| —
| —
|-
! scope="col" | 5
| Elesha Paul Moses
| 32
| "Everything Has Changed"
| —
| —
| style="background:orange;text-align:center;" | 
| —
|-style="background:#DCDCDC
! scope="col" | 6
| style="background:#DCDCDC; text-align:center;" | Lucy Winter
| style="background:#DCDCDC; text-align:center;" | 29
| style="background:#DCDCDC; text-align:center;" |"Somebody to Love"| —
| —
| —
| —
|-
! scope="col" | 7
| Max Murphy
| 18
| "Electric Feel"
| —
| —
| —
| style="background:orange;text-align:center;" | 
|-
! scope="col" | 8
| Joe Keegan
| 16
| "Keep Your Head Up"
| —
| style="background:#fdfc8f;text-align:center;" | 
| —
| 
|-
! scope="col" | 9
| James Byron
| 24
| "Cry Baby"
| style="background:orange;text-align:center;" | 
| —
| —
| —
|-style="background:#DCDCDC
! scope="col" | 10
| style="background:#DCDCDC; text-align:center;" | Reece Bahia
| style="background:#DCDCDC; text-align:center;" | 18
| style="background:#DCDCDC; text-align:center;" |"What Makes You Beautiful"
| —
| —
| —
| —
|-style="background:#DCDCDC
! scope="col" | 11
| style="background:#DCDCDC; text-align:center;" | Jolan
| style="background:#DCDCDC; text-align:center;" | 18
| style="background:#DCDCDC; text-align:center;" |"Beneath Your Beautiful"
| —
| —
| —
| —
|-style="background:#DCDCDC
! scope="col" | 12
| style="background:#DCDCDC; text-align:center;" | Yinka Williams
| style="background:#DCDCDC; text-align:center;" | 24
| style="background:#DCDCDC; text-align:center;" |"Paris (Ooh La La)"
| —
| —
| —
| —
|-
! scope="col" | 13
| style="background-color:#B2EC5D;"|Jade Mayjean Peters
| style="background-color:#B2EC5D;"|21
| style="background-color:#B2EC5D;"|"Sweet About Me"
| 
| style="background:#fdfc8f;text-align:center;" | 
| 
| 
|-
! scope="col" | 14
| Femi Santiago
| 27
| "My Cherie Amour"
| style="background:orange;text-align:center;" | 
| —
| —
| —
|}

Episode 6 (15 February)

This show was 80 minutes long, and aired from 7.10pm till 8.30pm.

Episode 7 (22 February)

This episode was 90 minutes long, and aired from 7.00pm till 8.30pm.

Battle rounds
The Battle rounds were broadcast over two episodes on the 1 and 8 March 2014. Each coach was joined by an advisor, with Minogue being joined by Scissor Sisters frontman Jake Shears, Wilson by singer Katy B, Jones with Tinie Tempah and will.i.am with last year's runner up and from his own team, Leah McFall, and once again by Dante Santiago. The first episode was 130 minutes long, and aired from 7.00pm till 9.10pm, and the second was 130 minutes long, and aired from 7.00pm till 9.10pm.
Like the previous season, each coach was given one steal, they can hit their button as many times as they like, but can only steal one artist from another coach.

Colour key

Knockout rounds
The Knockout rounds were broadcast over two episodes on the 15 and 16 March 2014. This series, however, the show decided to drop the "fast pass", and instead of singing in groups of three, each contestant sang in front of everyone else on the team. At the end of each knockout round the coach then decided out of all their contestants which three contestants to take to the live shows. The first episode was 75 minutes long, and aired from 7.20pm till 8.35pm, and the second was 75 minutes long, and aired from 7.45pm till 9.00pm.
Colour key:

Live shows
The live performance shows were aired live from Elstree Studios and ran for three consecutive weeks, beginning on 22 March 2014. The final took place on 5 April 2014.

OneRepublic and Jason Derulo performed during the quarter final, while Enrique Iglesias performed in the semi final, alongside Shakira. Aloe Blacc and Paloma Faith performed during the final.

Results summary
Team's colour key
 Team Will
 Team Kylie
 Team Tom
 Team Ricky
Result's colour key
 Artist given 'Fast Pass' by their coach and did not face the public vote
 Artist received the fewest votes and was eliminated 
 Artist won the competition

Live show details

Week 1: Quarter-final (22 March)
After all three artists from each team have performed, the coach will then have to decide which artist they want to give a "fast pass" to and put straight through to the semi-final. The voting lines for the remaining artists will then open after all twelve artists have performed.

The first part of the episode was 125 minutes long, and aired from 6.45pm until 8.40pm. The second part aired from 8.50pm until 9.25pm.

 Group performances: Team Will ("Scream & Shout"), Team Kylie ("All The Lovers"), Team Tom ("Burning Down The House") and Team Ricky ("Oh My God")
Special musical guests: Jason Derulo (medley of "Trumpets"/"Stupid Love"/"Talk Dirty") and OneRepublic ("Counting Stars")

Week 2: Semi-final (29 March)

This episode was 130 minutes long, and aired from 7.00pm until 9.10pm.

Group performances: Team Tom with Tom Jones ("Dancing in the Street"), Team Ricky with Ricky Wilson ("You Really Got Me"); Team Kylie with Kylie Minogue ("Into the Blue") and Team will with will.i.am ("Let's Dance")
 Musical guests: Enrique Iglesias ("I'm a Freak") and Shakira ("Empire")

Week 3: Final (5 April)

This episode was 125 minutes long, and aired from 7.00pm until 9.05pm.

Group performance: The Voice UK Coaches ("Rocks")
 Musical guests: Aloe Blacc ("The Man") and Paloma Faith ("Can't Rely on You")

Post-show success
Bob Blakeley, who was originally rejected by all four coaches, was given a record deal on live television. He has since released an album.

Anna McLuckie's rendition of "Get Lucky" received much positive feedback particularly on YouTube, as the official BBC version of the audition received three million views only a month after it was released, and over twenty-eight million views up to now. Other users uploaded the video, each getting millions of views as well. This was particularly noted as none other from this series had achieved more than a million views yet, and had even surpassed videos from Series 1 and 2. When Anna was eliminated during the Knockout Rounds, her coach Will.i.am was subject to much criticism, particularly on Twitter and YouTube. Celebrities such as One Direction's Niall Horan even disagreed with his decision. Since the show, McLuckie has continued her studies.

During the live shows, the BBC released studio versions of the songs to iTunes. Christina Marie's rendition of Everlong reached the iTunes Top 40. This was particularly noted as the week prior to the live shows, she had been ill, and had rarely rehearsed it to preserve her voice.

Reception

Critical reception
Following lukewarm responses from the British media after the first two series of the show, the response to the third series premiere was largely positive. Ed Power from The Daily Telegraph gave the series premiere 3 stars, praising Minogue for being "glamorous, agreeably giggly [and] a card-carrying national treasure". Power said that she "was a natural" and that she had "spontaneity to go with sass". He also complimented Wilson for being "chipper and unforced". Catriona Wightman from Digital Spy was very positive about the premiere, claiming that despite "reservations about whether Kylie would really manage to break through the nice girl mode" she was "brilliantly watchable", and that "Kylie's definitely a hit". The second blind audition continued to receive positive reviews from critics, receiving 4 (out of 5) stars by Michael Hogan from The Daily Telegraph, who commented that the "two new coaches add verve to The Voice UK and the newly confident singing contest seems to have found its feet" and that the new series "is a leap forward and the franchise has finally hit its stride." However, the Battle Rounds were criticised, with Gabriel Tate from The Daily Telegraph stating there were "few stand out moments" in the second battle round. He also said that "after such a promising start to the third series, it's a shame to see that The Voice falling foul once again of slack editing and familiarity of format." Keith Watson of The Metro gave the second battle round two stars, stating that the show was full of "overambitious [artists] being made promises of stardom that will never come true". The final received more positive reviews from the press, with Ed Power from The Daily Telegraph giving it 4 out of 5 stars, stating that the "tension was terrible" and it was a "drama soaked final". He also answered whether or not the addition of Kylie Minogue on the show would be successful, by saying that "we needn't have fretted. Kylie, it was clear from the very first episode, was a natural in the coaches chair." He concluded that "series three was assuredly a triumph – after much smoke and noise, The Voice'' has at last achieved lift-off."

Ratings

References

External links
 Official website

Series 03
Voice UK, The